The International Journal of Data Warehousing and Mining (IJDWM) is a quarterly peer-reviewed academic journal covering data warehousing and data mining. It was established in 2005 and is published by IGI Global. The editor-in-chief is David Taniar (Monash University, Australia).

Abstracting and indexing
The journal is abstracted and indexed in:

References

External links

Publications established in 2005
English-language journals
Quarterly journals
Data Warehousing and Mining, International Journal of
Computer science journals
Data warehousing
Data mining